is a professional Japanese baseball player.

External links

 NPB.com

1979 births
Living people
Baseball people from Akita Prefecture
Japanese baseball players
Nippon Professional Baseball pitchers
Hanshin Tigers players
Saitama Seibu Lions players
Tokyo Yakult Swallows players